Ittocorre Gambella was the regent of the Giudicato of Logudoro between 1127 and sometime before 1140. 

When Constantine I died around 1127, he left his young son Gonario II under the regency of Ittocorre. When the Athen family tried to harm the young ruler, Ittocorre whisked him away to Porto Torres and the protection of the Pisans, who took him to Pisa and the house of Ugo da Parlascio Ebriaco.

Further reading
Caravale, Mario (ed). Dizionario Biografico degli Italiani: LVII Giulini – Gonzaga. Rome, 2001.
Scano, D. "Serie cronol. dei giudici sardi." Arch. stor. sardo. 1939.
Besta, E. and Somi, A. I condaghi di San Nicolas di Trullas e di Santa Maria di Bonarcado. Milan, 1937.
Libellus iudicum Turritanorum.

Judges (judikes) of Logudoro
Regents
12th-century Italian nobility